Monte Vista High School is a comprehensive public high school located in Danville, California, United States. It is a National Blue Ribbon school, as well as a California Distinguished School. It is fully WASC accredited. Their school mascot is a mustang.

Academics

The school is fully accredited by the Western Association of Schools and Colleges, and offers college preparatory courses that are University of California A-G certified. In 2014, the school offered 23 Advanced Placement courses and 7 honors courses. The school also offers courses through the California Association of Regional Occupational Centers and Programs.

Sports
The Monte Vista Mustangs compete in the East Bay Athletic League (EBAL) of the CIF North Coast Section (NCS). They won the CIF championships in boys' basketball (2014) and girls' swimming (2017).

Notable alumni

 Mark Appel, baseball pitcher
 David Brevik, video game designer/programmer
 Leroy Chiao, astronaut
 Mike Crudale, professional baseball player
 Taylor Dent, tennis player
 Zach Ertz, NFL tight end
 Jake Haener, college football quarterback
 Tim Kang, actor
 George Komsky, opera singer and songwriter
 Nate Landman, NFL linebacker
 Jeff Lockie, football player
 Casey Merrill, NFL defensive end
 Bob Myers, professional basketball  general manager
 Judah Miller, comedy writer
 Murray Miller, comedy writer
 John Patitucci, jazz musician
 Chuck Prophet, musician
 Gar Ryness, 'Batting Stance Guy' 
 Adam Schiff, Member of US House of Representatives from California's 28th district
 Greg Sestero, actor and author
 Jessica Steffens, Olympic women's water polo
 Maggie Steffens, Olympic women's water polo
 Christy Turlington, model
 Bree Turner, actress
 Nicholas Vasallo, composer
 Joey Wagman, American-Israeli baseball player
 Ryan Whalen, NFL wide receiver
 Kevin Woo, K-pop
 Kyle Wright, football quarterback
 David Zuckerman, television producer
 Adam Schiff, US Senator

References

External links
 Monte Vista High School
The Stampede (Newspaper)

High schools in Contra Costa County, California
Public high schools in California
Educational institutions established in 1965
1965 establishments in California
Danville, California